Francis Brolly (13 January 1938 – 6 February 2020) was an Irish musician, teacher and Irish republican politician from Dungiven, Northern Ireland. Brolly was a Sinn Féin Member of the Northern Ireland Assembly (MLA) for  East Londonderry from 2003 to 2010, when he stood down.

His wife, Anne Brolly was the first Sinn Féin mayor and the first female Mayor of Limavady between 2003 and 2004, the council to which she was elected in 2001.

In 2005, he was arrested by the Police Service of Northern Ireland (PSNI) and questioned about a bombing incident in the village of Claudy in 1972. An official complaint was lodged with the Police Ombudsman regarding the lawfulness of the arrest and this investigation was ongoing. Brolly initiated a legal action in relation to the arrest, against the PSNI but he did not proceed with the matter. The case was 'stayed', which means Francie Brolly didn't pursue the matter and there was no out of court settlement, agreement, acceptance of liability or payment of compensation by the police.

In February 2018, Brolly left the Sinn Féin Party over its support for abortion. In March 2018 he and his wife joined Aontú, a new anti-abortion republican party founded by former Sinn Féin TD Peadar Tóibín.

Interests
Brolly was an Irish culture enthusiast. A lyricist and musician, he wrote many well-known Irish republican songs, most famously The H-Block Song. His daughter, Nodlaig, is also a well-known singer and Celtic harpist. He served as the Assembly spokesperson for Sinn Féin on Culture, Arts and Leisure, sitting on that department's oversight committee. He was also an Irish language enthusiast and a fluent speaker of the language.

He was a long-standing member of the GAA and played football for the Derry county team. He was an Executive Committee Member of St Canice's GAC Dungiven. His son Joe was part of Derry's 1993 All-Ireland Championship winning side and won two All Stars.

Death
Francie Brolly died on 6 February 2020.

References

1947 births
2020 deaths
Derry inter-county Gaelic footballers
Dungiven Gaelic footballers
Gaelic games club administrators
Irish anti-abortion activists
Irish language activists
Irish folk singers
Irish male singers
Irish sportsperson-politicians
Musicians from County Londonderry
Northern Ireland MLAs 2003-2007
Northern Ireland MLAs 2007–2011
People educated at St Columb's College
People from Dungiven
Politicians from County Londonderry
Place of death missing
Sinn Féin councillors in Northern Ireland
Sinn Féin MLAs
Sinn Féin parliamentary candidates
Aontú politicians